Lim Young-woo (born 26 July 1987 in South Korea) is a professional footballer from South Korea who last played for Balestier Khalsa FC in the S.League.

Balestier Khalsa

Doing the obligatory bleep test as a trialist for Balestier Khalsa, Lim's defending abilities were praised by coach Salim Moin, who described him having good reading of the game and a threat to set-pieces and counter-attacks. He was the first player from the November S.League trials to find a club as well. Through the course of his time in Singapore, the defender scored once- leveling the score for his team with a header as Balestier salvaged a 1–1 draw.

References

Association football defenders
1987 births
Living people
South Korean footballers
South Korean expatriate footballers
Singapore Premier League players
Balestier Khalsa FC players
Expatriate footballers in Singapore